Związek Pracy Obywatelskiej Kobiet (ZPOK) was a Polish women's organisation. It was founded in 1928 by Józef Piłsudski to encourage women's greater participation in public life.

References
 Organizacje kobiece w dwudziestoleciu międzywojennym. W: Kamilla Łozowska-Marcinkowska: Sprawy niewieście. Problematyka czasopism kobiecych Drugiej Rzeczypospolitej . Poznań: Wydawnictwo Poznańskie, 2010, s. 40.  . ( pol. )

Feminist organisations in Poland
1928 establishments in Poland
Organizations established in 1928